Erik Yim Kong (born May 1972) is a Hong Kong businessman and politician who is the chief operational officer and general manager of the China Merchants Port. In 2021, he was elected as the member of the Legislative Council for Commercial (Third), a newly created functional constituency under the electoral overhaul imposed by Beijing.

Electoral history

References 

Living people
1972 births
HK LegCo Members 2022–2025